The Gulf Coast Wing of the Commemorative Air Force is a United States historical air display organization which formerly included two sub-groups that participate in the display of vintage aircraft and public military history education about military aviation during World War II and beyond.

"Texas Raiders" group

The Commemorative Air Force's Gulf Coast Wing encompassed the "Texas Raiders" group, who maintained and operated the Boeing B-17G Flying Fortress (former U.S. Navy PB-1W) named Texas Raiders, which crashed on November 12, 2022.  It was based at the Conroe Regional Airport, located in Conroe, Texas. (Formerly based at David Wayne Hooks Memorial Airport in Tomball, Texas.)

See also
 History of transport

External links
Commemorative Air Force
Commemorative Air Force Gulf Coast Wing - B-17G "Texas Raiders"
Commemorative Air Force Tora! Tora! Tora! Group site

Aviation organizations based in the United States

de:Commemorative Air Force
fr:Commemorative Air Force
pt:Commemorative Air Force